Dawit II ( – 2 September 1540), also known by the macaronic name Wanag Segad (ወናግ ሰገድ, to whom the lions bow), better known by his birth name Lebna Dengel (essence of the virgin), was Emperor of Ethiopia from 1508 to 1540, whose political center and palace was in Shewa.

A male line descendant of the medieval Amhara kings, and thus a member of the House of Solomon, he was the son of Emperor Na'od and Empress Na'od Mogesa. The important victory over the Adal's Emir Mahfuz may have given Dawit the appellation "Wanag Segad," which is a combination of Geʽez and the Harari terms.

Biography

Early reign 
In contrast to previous emperors, Dawit had only one wife, Seble Wongel, whom he married around 1512–13. The couple had eight children: four sons and four daughters. Taking only one wife throughout his life was seen as a Christian act that fit with the ideals of the Church.

Although she was well into her seventies, the Empress Mother Eleni stepped in to act as her step-great-grandson's regent until 1516, when he came of age. During this time, she was aware that the neighboring Muslim states were benefitting from the assistance of other, larger Muslim countries like the Ottoman Empire.

Eleni sought to neutralize this advantage by dispatching the Ethiopian Armenian Mateus to Portugal to ask for assistance. However, the Portuguese response did not arrive in Ethiopia until much later, when an embassy led by Dom Rodrigo de Lima arrived at Massawa on 9 April 1520. Traversing the Ethiopian highlands, they did not reach Dawit's camp until 19 October of that year. Francisco Álvares provides us a description of the Emperor:

A follower of his late father, the monk Gebre Andrias slayed Emir Mahfuz of Adal in 1517 about the same time a Portuguese fleet attacked Zeila, a Muslim stronghold, and burned it. In 1523, Dawit campaigned amongst the Gurage near Lake Zway. Contemporaries concluded that the Muslim threat to Ethiopia was finally over, so when the diplomatic mission from Portugal arrived at last, Dawit denied that Mateus had the authority to negotiate treaties, ignoring Eleni's counsels. After a stay of six years, the Portuguese at last set sail and left a governing class who thought they were securely in control of the situation. As Paul B. Henze notes, "They were mistaken." According to Ethiopian chronicles, two decades into Dawit's ascension, a young man by the name Ahmed Ibrahim had rebelled against the Adal leaders and spread terror in the region. Dawit sent his general Delghan into Adal to confront him however the Abyssinian army was defeated at the Battle of Hubat by Ahmed's warriors.

Ethiopian–Adal war 

With the death of Sultan Abu Bakr ibn Muhammad in 1520, a young general and imam, Ahmad ibn Ibrahim al-Ghazi, consolidated his hold on the Adal Sultanate, making his candidate Umar Din sultan. Shortly before this, the Ottoman Empire had conquered Mamluk Egypt and were looking to expand into the red sea region. The Ethiopians had previously stolen firearms from the Mamluks during the reign of Yeshaq I but had not put them to use. In the 1520s, Emperor Lebna Dengel bought two swivel-guns from the Portuguese, as well as fourteen muskets acquired from Turks, he was thus ill equipped for the Ottoman backed invasion in 1527 which included thousands of Turkish and Arab flintlocks and matchlocks. The Imam crossed the Awash River and entered Fatagar in 1528, looting and burning the town of Badeqe before Dawit could arrive with his army. He began to withdraw, retreating across the Samara, a tributary of the Awash. 

The Imam's followers were accustomed to making lightning raids on Ethiopian territory, swiftly attacking and quickly returning home; they had no experience in pitched battles, and Ahmad Gragn struggled with numerous desertions.

The Emperor Dawit caught up with Imam Ahmad Gragn's forces, and they engaged in battle on either 7 or 9 March 1529, at the Battle of Shimbra Kure, but failed to destroy the Imam's army. Arab Faqīh states that many  Somali on the left flank retreated from the battlefield, with the Ethiopians pursuing them and killing a large number of their men, but that the Adalites (Harla/Harari) on the right flank managed to hold their ground. While not a clear victory for the Imam, this battle still proved to the Imam's followers that they could fight and defeat the Ethiopian army.

Imam Ahmad Gragn spent the next two years preoccupied beyond the Awash, but returned to attack Ethiopia in 1531, where he scattered the army under the general Eslamu by firing the first cannon in the Horn of Africa. Dawit was forced to withdraw into the Ethiopian highlands and fortify the passes into Bet Amhara ("the House of Amhara"), leaving the territories to the east and south under the protection of his general Wasan Sagad. However, Wasan Sagad was slain near Mount Busat while fighting Ura'i Utman on 29 July (5 Nahase 1524 A.M.) and his army scattered.

The Imam surprised the Emperor at the Battle of Amba Sel on 27 October, where the Emperor was almost captured, a reversal, in the words of R.S. Whiteway, that left Lebna Dengel "never in a position to offer a pitched battle to his enemies." The Imam's followers poured into Bet Amhara, pillaging every church they found, including Mekane Selassie, Atronsa Maryam, Debre Nagwadgwad and Ganata Giyorgis. Emperor Dawit fell back behind the Abay River to the relative security of Gojjam. Only their failure to capture the royal compound at Amba Geshen slowed the Muslims down.

In April 1533, Ahmad once again assembled his troops at Debre Berhan to conquer—or at least ravage—the northern regions of Tigray, Begemder, and Gojjam.

Both Ethiopia and Dawit suffered heavily from these assaults. The monastery of Debre Libanos was burned, and the establishments on the islands of Lake Tana looted. Dawit's eldest son Fiqtor was killed at Zara in Wag by a lieutenant of Ahmad on 7 April 1537; another son, Menas, was captured on 19 May 1539, and later sent to Yemen. Amba Geshen fell to another assault in January 1540, the royal prisoners interred there were slaughtered with their guards and the royal treasury looted.

Later life 

During the years he lived as an outlaw in his own realm constantly hounded by Imam Ahmed's soldiers the Malassay, Dawit came to see Queen Eleni's wisdom in reaching out to Europe for help, and he dispatched João Bermudes, who had arrived in Ethiopia with Dom Rodrigo de Lima, to ask for it once again. However, this help in the form of Cristóvão da Gama and his picked troop of 400 did not reach Ethiopia until after Dawit had died at the mountain-top Debre Damo monastery on 2 September 1540.

The Ethiopian historian Taddesse Tamrat writes, "The Muslim occupation of the Christian highlands under Ahmad Gragn lasted for little more than ten years, between 1531 and 1543. But the amount of destruction brought about in these years can only be estimated in terms of centuries."

Dawit was succeeded by his son Gelawdewos, as his son Menas had been captured by Ahmad a year before Dawit died. His release wasn't secured until 1543, when Queen Seble Wongel exchanged him for the captured son of Bati del Wambara and Ahmed after the Battle of Wayna Daga.

One of Dawit II's younger sons, Yaqob, is said to have stayed behind to hide in the province of Menz in Shewa. Yaqob's grandson Susenyos I defeated his various second cousins in 1604 to become Emperor and started the Gondar line of the Solomonic dynasty. Another grandson started the Shewan line of the Solomonic dynasty.

References 

1490s births
1540 deaths
16th-century monarchs in Africa
16th-century emperors of Ethiopia
Solomonic dynasty
Child monarchs from sub-Saharan Africa
Monarchs killed in action